Maxie Patton Kizzire (born March 3, 1986) is an American professional golfer, currently playing on the PGA Tour.

Amateur career
Kizzire was born in Montgomery, Alabama, grew up in Tuscaloosa, and played his collegiate golf at Auburn University. He earned all-Southeastern Conference first team honors in 2006–07. He won the 2007 SEC Championship. He graduated in 2008 with a Business degree. Kizzire placed third at the 2003 U.S. Junior Open.

Professional career
In December 2014, Kizzire tied for 21st place at the Web.com Tour Qualifying School final stage.

In his 2015 season on the Web.com Tour, he had a breakout season and was the Tour's money list leader for most of the season. He had two runner-up finishes at the El Bosque Mexico Championship and the Rex Hospital Open, before recording his first victory at the Utah Championship. With this victory, he secured his PGA Tour card for the 2015–16 season. He was one of the most consistent players on the Web.com Tour. He only missed two cuts in his first 15 events played on the tour. He had 10 finishes within the top-25 and had 9 top-10s. He also made an appearance on the PGA Tour at the Barbasol Championship, where he missed the cut. Kizzire was voted the Web.com Tour Player of the Year.

In his rookie season on the PGA Tour, Kizzire recorded five top-10 finishes and made 20 out of 27 cuts. His season best finish being a runner-up placing at the Shriners Hospitals for Children Open. He ended the year at number 82 in the FedEx Cup standings.

On October 16, 2016, Kizzire finished runner-up to Brendan Steele in the PGA Tour season-opening Safeway Open. Kizzire had entered the final round with his first PGA Tour 54-hole lead, by one stroke. He finished with a two-under par round to miss out by a single stroke. Kizzire finished the year placed 99th on the FedEx Cup standings.

On November 12, 2017, he won his first PGA Tour title at the OHL Classic at Mayakoba. Due to inclement weather, the players had to play 36 holes on Sunday, but Kizzire held off the challenge of Rickie Fowler to claim a one stroke victory.

On January 14, 2018, Kizzire won his second title of the 2018 PGA Tour season at the Sony Open in Hawaii played at Waialae Country Club. He prevailed in a sudden-death playoff, defeating James Hahn with a birdie on the sixth extra hole to become the first multiple winner in the 2018 season. This moved Kizzire to the top of the early FedEx Cup standings.

Personal
Patton is one of the tallest players on the PGA Tour, standing at 6 foot 5.  He uses all Titleist golf clubs and golf balls and has a Scotty Cameron putter. He is also sponsored by FootJoy, Peter Millar and Paylocity.

Professional wins (5)

PGA Tour wins (2)

PGA Tour playoff record (1–0)

Web.com Tour wins (2)

Web.com Tour playoff record (1–1)

Other wins (1)

Results in major championships
Results not in chronological order in 2020.

CUT = missed the half-way cut
"T" = tied
NT = No tournament due to COVID-19 pandemic

Summary

Most consecutive cuts made – 2 (2016 Open – 2016 PGA)

Results in The Players Championship

CUT = missed the halfway cut
"T" indicates a tie for a place
C = Canceled after the first round due to the COVID-19 pandemic

Results in World Golf Championships

QF, R16, R32, R64 = Round in which player lost in match play
"T" = tied

See also
2015 Web.com Tour Finals graduates

References

External links

American male golfers
Auburn Tigers men's golfers
PGA Tour golfers
Korn Ferry Tour graduates
Golfers from Alabama
Sportspeople from Montgomery, Alabama
Sportspeople from Tuscaloosa, Alabama
1986 births
Living people